"Close to Me" is a song by English singer Ellie Goulding with American musicians Diplo and Swae Lee, released on 24 October 2018 from the former's fourth studio album, Brightest Blue (2020). It was premiered by Annie Mac on BBC Radio 1 as the "Hottest Record in the World".

Background

Goulding told Billboard that the song came about when she and co-writer Savan Kotecha were in a Los Angeles studio where they came up with the guitar melody and Goulding sang what would become the first line of the pre-chorus, "don't let me down", which they decided to keep in the song. Goulding, feeling that the song was "missing something", eventually sent it to Diplo who sent his version back to her within a short amount of time. Diplo suggested adding Swae Lee as a featured guest vocalist.

Composition
The song is recorded in the key of E major with a tempo of 72 beats per minute in common time.  The song follows a chord progression of E–Cm7–G–A, and the vocals span from E3 to C5.

Music video
The music video for "Close to Me", directed by Diane Martel, was filmed in Budapest, Hungary, and premiered on 14 November 2018.

Promotion
Goulding wiped her social media accounts and began promoting the track on 22 October 2018, first sharing a cartoon image of hers, Diplo and Swae Lee's arms locked in a triangle, displaying their tattoos against a cheetah print background, captioning it "CLOSE TO ME". She then later confirmed this would be the title, and along with posting an audio clip of the track, announced the release date and time.

Other versions
In April 2019, Goulding released another version of the song featuring Korean girl group Red Velvet to replace Swae Lee's verse in the song.

Live performances
Goulding performed an acoustic version of the song during On Air with Ryan Seacrest on 16 November 2018. She later performed the song during BBC Radio 1's Live Lounge Month on 28 November. Her first televised performance of the song was on the final of The X Factor on 2 December.

Charts

Weekly charts

Year-end charts

Decade-end charts

Certifications

Release history

Red Velvet remix

On 5 April 2019, a remix was released which removed Swae Lee's verse and Korean girl group Red Velvet was featured, singing a verse in Korean and sang their own version of the chorus in Korean. Their chorus was written by Red Velvet's Wendy & Yeri. It has won
a "Choice Electronic / Dance Song" award at the 2019 Teen Choice Awards.

Track listing

Release history

References

2018 singles
2018 songs
Ellie Goulding songs
Diplo songs
Swae Lee songs
Macaronic songs
Songs written by Ellie Goulding
Songs written by Diplo
Songs written by Swae Lee
Songs written by Savan Kotecha
Song recordings produced by Diplo
Song recordings produced by Ilya Salmanzadeh
Songs written by Ilya Salmanzadeh
Songs written by Peter Svensson
Music videos directed by Diane Martel
Interscope Records singles
Polydor Records singles